Huey Long is an American documentary film on the life and career of the politician Huey Long. It was directed by Ken Burns, and produced by Ken Burns and Richard Kilberg in 1985. The film first aired on October 15, 1986. The film includes interviews with Russell B. Long, author Robert Penn Warren, and political contemporary and opponent Cecil Morgan. It was narrated by the historian David McCullough.

External links
Official site on PBS

1985 films
American documentary television films
Films directed by Ken Burns
1986 documentary films
Documentary films about American politicians
Huey Long
1980s English-language films
1980s American films